New Album is the fifteenth studio album by the Japanese experimental band Boris. The album was released in Japan on March 16, 2011, on CD through Tearbridge (an imprint of major label Avex) and on double LP through Daymare Recordings, and was released worldwide with a different mix and track list through Sargent House on November 25, 2011. The CD and LP feature different versions of several tracks.

The label released the song "Party Boy" prior to the album, which also appears in an altered form on Attention Please. Other tracks shared with that album are "Hope" and "Spoon". The album also shares the tracks "Jackson Head" and "Tu, La La" with Heavy Rocks. "Black Original" has appeared on Japanese Heavy Rock Hits with different instrumentation than the two versions used for this release.

Spin put up a full stream of the Sargent House CD version on November 29, 2011.

Track listing

Daymare 12" LP

Tearbridge CD

Sargent House CD

Personnel
 Takeshi - Vocals, bass & guitar
 Wata - Vocals, guitar & keyboard
 Atsuo - Drums & percussion

Pressing history

References

External links
 

2011 albums
Boris (band) albums
Avex Group albums